T. Austin and Ernestine L. Finch House is a historic house located in Thomasville, North Carolina. Built-in 1921, it is listed on the National Register of Historic Places.

History 
The 6,570-sq.ft house was erected as per Renaissance Revival architecture style in 1921 on a lot that Ernestine Lambeth Finch received as a wedding gift from her parents John Walter and Daisy Sumner Lambeth, who then resided in the home on the adjacent parcel to the east. It was later enlarged in 1938. The structure consists of "stuccoed walls, green Ludowici-Celadon tile (Terracotta) hip roof, deep eaves supported by shaped rafter ends, wood casement and double-hung multipane windows and French doors".

As of 2021, the house is privately owned and it's premises are offered as a destination wedding venue.

References

Houses on the National Register of Historic Places in North Carolina
Houses completed in 1850
Houses in Davidson County, North Carolina
National Register of Historic Places in Davidson County, North Carolina